Perspective is P-Model's fourth album.

Overview
Perspective has a tense atmosphere, a continuation of the darker style exhibited on Potpourri, and the arguably the heaviest of any P-Model outing. Bandleader Susumu Hirasawa shouts his vocals to the backdrop of loud drums and bass, instruments randomly cut in and out, guitar parts are sinister. The compositions are simple and lyrics abstract.

Hirasawa focused on sound, insisting on natural reverb instead of digital reverb, and so recording the drum parts on the landing of a stairwell in the building where the album's studio was located. This method led to complications and constant fighting between P-Model and the recording engineer, who insisted on using digital reverb. In the end, it was settled without the engineer and all recording was made Hirasawa's way.

Track listing

Perspective II

Perspective II is an alternate version of Perspective originally released exclusively on Compact Cassette, a first for the group. While it has no drastic changes from Perspective, Perspective II has a different mix and two new instrumentals. Some of the new material features the use of a drum machine, which is completely absent from Perspective.

Track listing

Personnel
P-Model - Production, Arrangements
Susumu Hirasawa - Vocals, Guitar, Synthesizer, Drum machine
Yasumi Tanaka - Keyboards
Sadatoshi Tainaka - Drums
Tatsuya Kikuchi - Bass

Staff
Shōzō Shiba - Direction
Akira "POKARI" Sasaki - Recording, Mixing
Mamoru "PONTA II" Ishitashi & Shōji Nakano - Assistant Engineering
Yūichi Hirasawa (credited as "Y. Hirasawa") - Art director
Api Yomiya - Photography
Model House - Productive Management

Release history
{|class="wikitable"
! Date
! Label(s)
! Format
! Catalog
! Album
! Notes
|-
|rowspan=2 |
|rowspan=2 |Tokuma Japan Corporation, Japan Record
|LP
|JAL-19
|Perspective
|Resold by Vivid Sound circa 1987, only difference is the catalogue number (PRL-1016) and a slightly different obi.
|-
|CS
|28J-17
|Perspective II
|Resold by Vivid Sound with the catalogue number PRC-1092.
|-
|
|rowspan=2 |Tokuma Japan Corporation, WAX Records
|rowspan=5 |CD
|27WXD-119
|Perspective
|Released alongside Another Game.
|-
|
|TKCA-30335
|Perspective II
|Due to dimensional differences between formats, this release's art is near identical to that of Perspective'''s.
|-
|
|Tokuma Japan Communications, WAX Records
|TKCA-70479
|Perspective|Released alongside Another Game. Part of the "Quality Music" series of budget reissues. Packaged in a slimline case and priced at 1500 yen.
|-
|
|Chaos Union, Teslakite
|CHTE-0007
|Perspective & Perspective II|Remastered by Hirasawa. Disc 3 of the Ashu-on [Sound Subspecies] in the solar system box set. Re-released with new packaging by Kiyoshi Inagaki.
|-
|
|Tokuma Japan Communications, sky station, SS RECORDINGS
|SS-902
|Perspective & Perspective II (titled Perspective +11 Tracks)
|Remastered (digitally, 24 bit). Packaged in a paper sleeve to replicate the original LP packaging. Includes new liner notes by music industry writer Dai Onojima.
|-
|
|Tokuma Japan Communications, WAX Records
|SHM-CD
|TKCA-10133
|Perspective|Released alongside Another Game. Remastered, limited release. Packaged in a paper sleeve to replicate the original LP packaging.
|}

"Heaven" is included on the rebel incorporated various artists compilation.
"Perspective" is included on the J-ROCK 80'S various artists compilation.
"Train" (Perspective II version) is included on the GROOVIN' Shōwa! 7～Romantist'' various artists compilation.

References

External links
 Perspective at NO ROOM - The official site of Susumu Hirasawa (P-MODEL)
 
 Perspective II at NO ROOM - The official site of Susumu Hirasawa (P-MODEL)
 
 Perspective +11 Tracks at SS RECORDINGS Official Site

1982 albums
P-Model albums
Japanese-language albums